Daniel Sandoval may refer to:

 Daniel Sandoval (boxer) (born 1991), Mexican boxer
 Daniel Sandoval (BMX rider) (born 1994), American BMX rider
 Dani Sandoval (born 1998), Spanish footballer